Karoline Kamakshi is a 2019 Tamil-language action comedy streaming television series starring Meena, Giorgia Andriani, Angelina and Anto. The series is the first South Indian venture of the Bollywood actor Andriani. Karoline Kamashki was released on ZEE5 on 5 December 2019.

Synopsis 
Karoline, a French detective and Kamakshi, a CBI officer are required to work together to catch the international bootlegger, Furkin.

Cast 
 Meena as Agent Kamakshi, a clumsy, timid and lazy CBI Officer who is sent on the quest to retrieve the stolen Virgin Mary artefact from Furkhin.
 Giorgia Andriani as Agent Karoline, an alcoholic French Secret Agent who is also sent on the quest to retrieve he stolen Virgin Mary artefact from Furkhin as Kamakshi's partner.
 Y. G. Mahendran as Chidhambharam, Director of the Indian CBI and Kamakshi's mentor
 Balaji Murugadoss as Vikram, Furkhin's new partner, who fools Karoline and Kamakshi pretending to be a police informer, who is the actual mastermind in the theft of the Virgin Mary and the Crown
 "Poraali" Dhileepan as Inspector Kunju Mohan, a Pondichery Police Inspector tailing Karoline and Kamakshi on their mission
 Veena Angelina Sweety as Victoria, Furkhin's Gun Moll and Old Monk's girlfriend
 Anto Thomas as Furkhin, an international smuggler who smuggles and deals in artefacts, who steals the Virgin Mary from the National Museum of France
 Spike John as Old Monk, Furkhin's assistant and Karoline and Kamakshi's lead on the Virgin Mary
 TSR  as Dr. Venkadam, a Veterinary Doctor who treats Old Monk
 K.P.Sathish as Sameer, an assassin hired by Fukhrin to assassinate Karoline and Kamakshi
 Prabhakar
 Raaghav as Kamakshi's husband
 Uma Sreenivasan as Kamakshi's mother-in-law
 Pranita.N as Mallika, Kamakshi's daughter

Episodes

Reception 
The series opened to a negative response from audience and critics.

References

External links 
 
Karoline Kamakshi on ZEE5

ZEE5 original programming
Tamil-language web series
Tamil-language action television series
Tamil-language comedy television series
2019 Tamil-language television series debuts